Birganj Pilot Government High School is a public secondary school located in Birganj Upazila of Dinajpur District, Bangladesh.

History 
The school was established in 1962 as Birganj Pilot Multipurpose School. It was nationalized in 1985.

Structure 
The main campus is established on  land. Another  for gardens.

Achievements 
The school won 3rd place in the project presentation of 41st National Science and Technology Week-2019 and 1st place in debate competition. As well, 1st place in project presentation of 40th National Science and Technology Week-2019 and 1st place in debate competition and Science Olympiad.

References

External links 
 

Schools in Dinajpur District, Bangladesh
Educational institutions established in 1962
1962 establishments in East Pakistan